Permafrost is permanently frozen ground found in periglacial zones.

Permafrost may also refer to:

 Permafrost (novella), a 2019 novella by Alastair Reynolds
 "Permafrost" (story), a 1987 Hugo Award winning novelette by Roger Zelazny
 Permafrost: Literary Journal, the student newspaper of the University of Alaska Fairbanks English department
 Permafrost (album), a 1993 dark ambient album by Thomas Köner
 "Permafrost", a track from the 1979 album Secondhand Daylight by UK-based post-punk band Magazine
 Permafrost, a character on the Static Shock television series
 Dr. Permafrost, a (nominal) villain of the comic series Tom Strong
 Permafrost, a zone in the fictional universe of EverQuest, a computer game